The 1994–95 Rugby Football League season was the 100th ever season of professional rugby league football in Britain. Sixteen teams competed from August 1994 until May 1995 for a number of titles, primarily the Stones Bitter Championship.

Season summary
The summer Super League concept was agreed to commence in 1996.

Stones Bitter League Champions: Wigan (16th title)
Silk Cut Challenge Cup Winners: Wigan (30-10 v Leeds)
Stones Bitter Premiership Trophy Winners: Wigan (69-12 v Leeds)
Harry Sunderland Trophy: Kris Radlinski
Regal Trophy Winners: Wigan (7 - 40-10 v Warrington)
2nd Division Champions: Keighley

The record for most points scored by one team in a match was broken by Huddersfield when they clocked up 142 against Blackpool Gladiators' 4 in a Regal Trophy match on 26 November 1994. This is also the record for widest margin.

The 1995 Man of Steel Award for the player of the season went to Wigan's Denis Betts. Wigan also set a new record for most points in all matches in one season with 1,735 from 45 matches as follows: 
Division One Championship: 1,148 (from 30 games)
Challenge Cup 230 (from 6 games)
Regal Trophy 170 (from 5 games)
Premiership Trophy 167 (from 3 games)
Tour match (Australia) 20 (from 1 game)

Rule changes
The following rule changes were introduced this season by the referees' coaching director, Greg McCallum:
 Referees were given the power to put a player suspected of foul play "on report" with the incident to be reviewed later by the disciplinary panel.  The system was based on the one already operating in Australian rugby league. Referees signalled that an incident had been put "on report" by crossing their raised arms above their heads.
 In-goal judges were trialled, these two additional match officials are positioned behind the dead-ball line at each end of the playing field and aim to aid the referee in judging if a try has been scored. The in-goal judges had been used in Australia for two years.
 McCallum ordered referees to penalise defending players lifting attackers in the tackle in a way that could lead to an illegal spear tackle.

Leeds' Gary Mercer (dangerous throw), Sheffield Eagles' Paul Broadbent and Doncaster's Gordon Lynch (tripping) became the first players cited under the reporting system to be found to have a case to answer.

Standings

Championship

In preparation for the change to summer matches for the Super League, the position teams finished in this season was critical, as it determined which of the new fore-shortened three divisions they would play next season. The team finishing bottom would be relegated to the second Division and teams finishing 11th to 15th would make up the new First Division.

Second Division

The teams finishing in the top 7 went on to form the new First Division with teams from the Championship. London Broncos were fast tracked into the Championship as they were to be part of the new Super League in 1996.

Premiership

Regal Trophy

Challenge Cup

Rounds One and Two were contested between amateur clubs only. Millom were the biggest winners in Round One when they defeated Northampton Knights by 62-4. The biggest win in Round Two was Wigan St Patricks who defeated Crown Malet 42-6.

Round Three saw teams from Division Two matched at home against an amateur opponent. There was one shock result, when Beverley beat Highfield by 27-4. Dewsbury recorded the most points in Round Three when they defeated Kells by 72-12, though the biggest margin of victory went to Keighley who beat Chorley 68-0.

In Round Four, the Division One sides entered the competition with no seeding. There were two shock results when Huddersfield defeated Halifax 36-30 and Whitehaven beat Wakefield Trinity by 24-12. Hunslet drew with Salford 32-32 to take them to a replay before going down by 52-10.

Results from Fifth round:

Statistics
The following are the top points scorers in all competitions in the 1994–95 season.

Most tries

Most goals (including drop goals)

Notes

References
 
"Club-by-club guide to the new season", The Independent, 19 August 1994
1994–95 Rugby Football League season at rlhalloffame.org.uk
1994–95 Rugby Football League season at wigan.rlfans.com
Wigan's record Cup run at news.bbc.co.uk
Great Britain Competitions 1994-1995 at hunterlink.net.au
Championship 1994/95 at rugbyleagueproject.org

Rugby Football League seasons
1995 in English rugby league
1994 in English rugby league